The Suzuki TL1000R motorcycle was introduced in 1998 as Suzuki's 90° V-Twin Superbike. Production ended in 2003.

General background 

The TL1000R is a full fairing racing-oriented version of Suzuki's popular TL1000S. The TL1000R was launched in 1998, one year after its sibling, the TL1000S. Unlike the TL-S, the TL-R was designed to compete in the World and American Superbike Championships, although it achieved only one race win before Suzuki pulled the plug on the TL racing program, in favor of returning to the lighter GSX-R750 as its Superbike entry. The TL-R took aim at Ducati's 916 both in the Superbike Championship and in consumer sales. The R shares basic engine architecture with the S but has special components including forged pistons, stronger connecting rods, and a much stiffer frame while retaining the motors 90° V-twin for perfect primary balance and had hybrid chain/gear driven cams. A traditional cam chain turned a gear that in turn rotated the cams. This hybrid design eased maintenance immensely and gave the motor additional aural character because of the gear whine. The engine tweaks given to the TL-R made it known for its very good top-end horsepower (as compared to most V-twins that make better bottom end power). The TL-R was offered in yellow, blue/white, black, and red.  Suzuki stopped production of the TL1000S in 2001, and the TL1000R in 2003.

Specifications 

All specifications are manufacturer claimed.

See also 
Suzuki SV1000
Suzuki TL1000S

References

External links 
 
 MCN AU Online review

TL1000R
Sport bikes
Motorcycles introduced in 1998